Areal ( or ) is a municipality located in the Brazilian state of Rio de Janeiro. Its population was 12,669 (2020) and its area is 111 km².

References

Municipalities in Rio de Janeiro (state)